Mitar Novaković (born 27 September 1981) is a Montenegrin retired footballer who played as a central midfielder. Internationally, Novaković represented Montenegro, making 25 appearances between 2007 and 2013.

Club career
He had a lengthy spell in Russian football with Amkar Perm. After a short break from playing football, he rejoined hometown club Mornar in July 2015.

International career
Novaković made his debut for Montenegro in a September 2007 friendly match against Sweden in Podgorica and has earned a total of 25 caps, scoring no goals. His final international was an August 2013 friendly away against Belarus.

References

External links

 
 

1981 births
Living people
People from Bar, Montenegro
Association football midfielders
Serbia and Montenegro footballers
Serbia and Montenegro under-21 international footballers
Montenegrin footballers
Montenegro international footballers
FK Mornar players
FK Zvezdara players
FK BSK Borča players
FK Čukarički players
FK Radnički Beograd players
FK Železnik players
FK Rad players
OFK Beograd players
FC Amkar Perm players
Second League of Serbia and Montenegro players
First League of Serbia and Montenegro players
Serbian SuperLiga players
Russian Premier League players
Montenegrin First League players
Montenegrin expatriate footballers
Expatriate footballers in Russia
Montenegrin expatriate sportspeople in Russia